Phylace or Phylake (Φυλακή, Phylake; plural: Φυλακαί Phylakai - lit. "prison") may refer to:
 Phylace (Arcadia), an ancient Greek city in Arcadia
 Phylace (Epirus), an ancient Greek city in Epirus
 Phylace (Thessaly), an ancient Greek city in Thessaly
 Phylace (Pieria), an ancient Greek city in Macedonia
 Amblyscirtes phylace, a species of butterfly of the family Hesperiidae
 Eulithis (syn. Phylace), a genus of moth in the family Geometridae
 A term used to denote Hell or Tartarus 
A term referring to the spirits in prison

See also
 Phylacia, a genus of fungi in the family Xylariaceae